No. 515 Squadron RAF was a squadron of the Royal Air Force formed during the Second World War. It ushered in Electronic countermeasures (ECM) warfare, jamming enemy radar installations from October 1942 as the only such squadron in the RAF initially. Later in the war 515 Sqn was joined by other squadrons as part of No. 100 Group RAF. The squadron disbanded after VE day, when the need for such a specialised squadron had reduced.

History

Fighter Command
The squadron was formed from Defiant Flight, also known as Special Duties Flight – an electronic countermeasuress unit equipped with the Boulton Paul Defiant Mk.II – at RAF Northolt on 1 October 1942,  It moved to RAF Heston later that month. As part of 11 Group, 515 Sqn performed radar jamming duties, using Moonshine and Mandrel  equipment.

From May 1943, 515 Sqn re-equipped with the Bristol Beaufighter Mk.IIF.

Bomber Command
The squadron transferred to No. 100 Group RAF in December 1943 as part of Bomber Command, and moved to RAF Little Snoring in Norfolk. There they re-equipped with de Havilland Mosquito Mk.VIs in March 1944, and operated these for the remainder of the war. At the time of its disbandment on 10 June 1945, 515 squadron had carried out 1,366 operational sorties with the Mosquito with a loss of 21 aircraft, with most of its aircrew transferring to No. 627 Squadron RAF. T

Moonshine
Moonshine was the code-name for ARI TR1427, (Airborne Radio Installation Transmitter Receiver), a British airborne spoofer/jammer installed in the 20 modified Boulton Paul Defiants of No. 515 Squadron RAF to defeat Freya radar and was developed at the Telecommunications Research Establishment (TRE).

Mandrel
Mandrel was the code-name for a jammer deployed against Freya and Würzburg radars used by aircraft of 515 sqn and 100 Group. Developed at the TRE, Mandrel was also built in the United States as AN/APT-3.

Aircraft operated

Squadron bases

Commanding officers

See also
 List of Royal Air Force aircraft squadrons
 Boulton Paul Defiant Operational history
 Freya radar, the German early-warning radar that was jammed using "Moonshine" and "Mandrel"
 List of World War II electronic warfare equipment

References

Notes

Bibliography

External links
 Squadron history 1 on MOD site
 Squadron history 2 on MOD site
 No. 515 Squadron RAF movement and equipment history
 squadron histories for nos. 500–520 sqn on RafWeb's Air of Authority – A History of RAF Organisation
 unofficial website for no. 515 Sqn

515
Aircraft squadrons of the Royal Air Force in World War II
Electronic warfare units and formations
Military units and formations established in 1942
Military units and formations disestablished in 1945